José Oscar Barahona Castillo (11 November 1938 – 22 October 2016) was a Catholic bishop.

Ordained to the priesthood in 1963, Barahona Castillo served as auxiliary of the Catholic Diocese of San Vicente, El Salvador, from 1982 to 1983. He then served as diocesan bishop of the San Vincente Diocese from 1983 to 2005.

Notes

1938 births
2016 deaths
20th-century Roman Catholic bishops in El Salvador
21st-century Roman Catholic bishops in El Salvador
Roman Catholic bishops of San Vicente